The Illyrians (Illyrioi) were a group of Indo-European-speaking peoples who inhabited the western Balkan Peninsula in ancient times. They constituted one of the three main Paleo-Balkan populations, along with the Thracians and Greeks.

The territory the Illyrians inhabited came to be known as Illyria to later Greek and Roman authors, who identified a territory that corresponds to most of Albania, Montenegro, Kosovo, much of Croatia and Bosnia and Herzegovina, western and central Serbia and some parts of Slovenia between the Adriatic Sea in the west, the Drava river in the north, the Morava river in the east and the Ceraunian Mountains in the south. The first account of Illyrian peoples dates back to the 6th century BC, in the works of the ancient Greek writer Hecataeus of Miletus.

The name "Illyrians", as applied by the ancient Greeks to their northern neighbors, may have referred to a broad, ill-defined group of peoples. It has been suggested that the Illyrian tribes never collectively identified as  "Illyrians", and that it is unlikely that they used any collective nomenclature at all. Illyrians seems to be the name of a specific Illyrian tribe who were among the first to encounter the ancient Greeks during the Bronze Age. The Greeks later applied this term Illyrians, pars pro toto, to all people with similar language and customs.

In archaeological, historical and linguistic studies, research about the Illyrians, from the late 19th to the 21st century, has moved from Pan-Illyrian theories, which identified as Illyrian even groups north of the Balkans to more well-defined groupings based on Illyrian onomastics and material anthropology since the 1960s as newer inscriptions were found and sites excavated. There are two principal Illyrian onomastic areas: the southern and the Dalmatian-Pannonian, with the area of the Dardani as a region of overlapping between the two. A third area, to the north of them – which in ancient literature was usually identified as part of Illyria – has been connected more to the Venetic language than to Illyrian. Illyric settlement in Italy was and still is attributed to a few ancient tribes which are thought to have migrated along the Adriatic shorelines to the Italian peninsula from the geographic "Illyria": the Dauni, the Peuceti and Messapi (collectively known as Iapyges).

The term "Illyrians" last appears in the historical record in the 7th century, referring to a Byzantine garrison operating within the former Roman province of Illyricum. What happened to the Illyrians after the settlement of the Slavs in the region is a matter of debate among scholars, and includes the question whether the Albanian language is a descendant of an Illyrian language.

Etymology 
While the Illyrians are largely recorded under the ethnonyms of Illyrioi (Ἰλλυριοί) and Illyrii, these appear to be misspelt renditions by Greek or Latin-speaking writers. Based on historically attested forms denoting specific Illyrian tribes or the Illyrians as a whole (e.g., Úlloí (Ύλλοί) and Hil(l)uri),
the native tribal name from which these renditions were based has been reconstructed by linguists such as Heiner Eichner as *Hillurio- (< older *Hullurio-). According to Eichner, this ethnonym, translating to 'water snake', is derived from Proto-Indo-European *ud-lo ('of water, aquatic') sharing a common root with Ancient Greek üllos (ϋλλος) meaning 'fish' or a 'small water snake'. The Illyrian ethnonym shows a dl > ll shift via assimilation as well as the addition of the suffix -uri(o) which is found in Illyrian toponyms such as Tragurium.

Eichner also points out the tribal name's close semantic correspondence to that of the Enchelei which translates to 'eel-people', depicting a similar motif of aquatic snake-like fauna. It is also pointed out that the Ancient Greeks must have learned this name from a tribe in southern Illyria, later applying it to all related and neighbouring peoples.

Terminology and attestation 
The terms 'Illyrians', 'Illyria' and 'Illyricum' have been used throughout history for ethnic and geographic contextualizations that have changed over time. Re-contextualizations of these terms often confused ancient writers and modern scholars. Notable scholarly efforts have been dedicated to trying to analyze and explain these changes.

The first known mention of Illyrians occurred in the late 6th and the early 5th century BC in fragments of Hecataeus of Miletus, the author of Γενεαλογίαι (Genealogies) and of Περίοδος Γῆς or Περιήγησις (Description of the Earth or Periegesis), where the Illyrians are described as a barbarian people. In the Macedonian history during the 6th and 5th century B.C., the term 'Illyrian' had a political meaning that was quite definite, denoting a kingdom established on the north-western borders of Upper Macedonia. From the 5th century B.C. onwards, the term 'Illyrian' was already applied to a large ethnic group whose territory extended deep into the Balkan mainland. Ancient Greeks clearly considered the Illyrians as a completely distinct ethnos from both the Thracians (Θρᾷκες) and the Macedonians (Μακεδόνες).

Most scholars hold that the territory originally designated as 'Illyrian' was roughly located in the region of the south-eastern Adriatic (modern Albania and Montenegro) and its hinterland, then was later extended to the whole Roman Illyricum province, which stretched from the eastern Adriatic to the Danube. After the Illyrians had come to be widely known to the Greeks due to their proximity, this ethnic designation was broadened to include other peoples who, for some reason, were considered by ancient writers to be related with those peoples originally designated as Illyrians (Ἰλλυριοί, Illyrioi).

The original designation may have occurred either during the Middle/Late Bronze Age or at the beginning of the 8th century BC. According to the former hypothesis, the name was taken by traders from southern Greece from a small group of people on the coast, the Illyrioi/Illyrii (first mentioned by Pseudo-Skylax and later described by Pliny the Elder), and thereafter applied to all of the people of the region; this has been explained by the substantial evidence of Minoan and Mycenaean contact in the valley where the Illyrioi/Illyrii presumably lived. According to the latter hypothesis the label Illyrians was first used by outsiders, in particular Ancient Greeks; this has been argued on the basis that when the Greeks began to frequent the eastern Adriatic coast with the colonization of Corcyra, they started to have some knowledge and perceptions of the indigenous peoples of western Balkans.

It has been suggested that the Illyrian tribes evidently never collectively identified themselves as Illyrians and that it is unlikely that they used any collective nomenclature at all. Most modern scholars are certain that all the peoples of western Balkans that were collectively labeled as 'Illyrians' were not a culturally or linguistically homogeneous entity. For instance, some tribes like the Bryges would not have been identified as Illyrian. What criteria were initially used to define this group of peoples or how and why the term 'Illyrians' began to be used to describe the indigenous population of western Balkans cannot be said with certainty. Scholarly debates have been waged to find an answer to the question whether the term 'Illyrians' (Ἰλλυριοί) derived from some eponymous tribe, or whether it has been applied to designate the indigenous population as a general term for some other specific reason.

Illyrii proprie dicti

Ancient Roman writers Pliny the Elder and Pomponius Mela used the term Illyrii proprie dicti ('properly called Illyrians') to designate a people that was located in the coast of modern Albania and Montenegro. Many modern scholars view the 'properly called Illyrians' as a trace of the Illyrian kingdom known in the sources from the 4th century BC until 167 BC, which was ruled in Roman times by the Ardiaei and Labeatae when it was centered in the Bay of Kotor and Lake Skadar. According to other modern scholars, the term Illyrii may have originally referred only to a small ethnos in the area between Epidaurum and Lissus, and Pliny and Mela may have followed a literary tradition that dates back as early as Hecataeus of Miletus. Placed in central Albania, the Illyrii proprie dicti also might have been Rome's first contact with Illyrian peoples. In that case, it did not indicate an original area from which the Illyrians expanded. The area of the Illyrii proprie dicti is largely included in the southern Illyrian onomastic province in modern linguistics.

Origins

Archaeology
The Illyrians emerged from the fusion of PIE-descended Yamnaya-related population movements ca. 2500 BCE in the Balkans with the pre-existing Balkan Neolithic population, initially forming "Proto-Illyrian" Bronze Age cultures in the Balkans. The proto-Illyrians during the course of their settlement towards the Adriatic coast merged with such populations of a pre-Illyrian substratum – like Enchelei might have been –, leading to the formation of the historical Illyrians who were attested in later times. It has been suggested that the myth of Cadmus and Harmonia may be a reflection in mythology of the end of the pre-Illyrian era in the southern Adriatic region as well as in those regions located north of Macedonia and Epirus.

Older Pan-Illyrian theories which emerged in the 1920s placed the proto-Illyrians as the original inhabitants of a very large area which reached central Europe. These theories, which have been dismissed, were used in the politics of the era and its racialist notions of Nordicism and Aryanism. The main fact which these theories tried to address was the existence of traces of Illyrian toponymy in parts of Europe beyond the western Balkans, an issue whose origins are still unclear. The specific theories have found little archaeological corroboration, as no convincing evidence for significant migratory movements from the Urnfield-Lusatian culture into the west Balkans has ever been found.

Archaeogenetics
Mathieson et al. 2018 archaeogenetic study included three samples from Dalmatia: two Early & Middle Bronze Age (1631-1521/1618-1513 calBCE) samples from Veliki Vanik (near Vrgorac) and one Iron Age (805-761 calBCE) sample from Jazinka Cave in Krka National Park. According to ADMIXTURE analysis they had approximately 60% Early European Farmers, 33% Western Steppe Herders and 7% Western Hunter-Gatherer-related ancestry. The male individual from Veliki Vanik carried the Y-DNA haplogroup J2b2a1-L283 while his and two female individuals mtDNA haplogroup were I1a1, W3a1 and HV0e. Freilich et al. 2021 identify the Veliki Vanik samples as related to the Cetina culture (EBA-MBA western Balkans).

Patterson et al. 2022 study examined 18 samples from the Middle Bronze Age up to Early Iron Age Croatia, which was part of Illyria. Out of the nine Y-DNA samples retrieved, which coincide with the historical territory where Illyrians lived (including tested Iapydes and Liburni sites), almost all belonged to the patrilineal line J2b2a1-L283 (>J-PH1602 > J-Y86930 and >J-Z1297 subclades) with the exception of one R1b-L2. The mtDNA haplogroups fell under various subclades of H, H1, H3b, H5, J1c2, J1c3, T2a1a, T2b, T2b23, U5a1g, U8b1b1, HV0e. In a three-way admixture model, they approximately had 49-59% EEF, 35-46% Steppe and 2-10% WHG-related ancestry. In Lazaridis et al. (2022) key parts of the territory of historical territory of Illyria were tested. In 18 samples from the Cetina culture, all males except for one (R-L51 > Z2118) carried Y-DNA haplogroup J-L283. Many of them could be further identified as J-L283 > Z597 (> J-Y15058 > J-Z38240 > J-PH1602). The majority of individuals carried mtDNA haplogroups J1c1 and H6a1a. The related Posušje culture yielded the same Y-DNA haplogroup (J-L283 > J-Z38240). The same J-L283 population appears in the MBA-IA Velim Kosa tumuli of Liburni in Croatia (J-PH1602), and similar in LBA-IA Velika Gruda tumuli in Montenegro (J-Z2507 > J-Z1297 > J-Y21878). The oldest J-L283 (> J-Z597) sample in the study was found in MBA Shkrel, northern Albania as early as the 19th century BCE. In northern Albania, IA Çinamak, half of them men carried J-L283 (> J-Z622, J-Y21878) and the other half R-M269 (R-CTS1450, R-PF7563). The oldest sample in Çinamak dates to the first era of post-Yamnaya movements (EBA) and carries R-M269. Autosomally, Croatian Bronze Age samples from various sites, from Cetina valley and Bezdanjača Cave were "extremely similar in their ancestral makeup", while from Montenegro's Velika Gruda mainly had an admixture of "Anatolian Neolithic (~50%), Eastern European hunter-gatherer (~12%), and Balkan hunter-gatherer ancestry (~18%)". The oldest Balkan J-L283 samples have bee found in final Early Bronze Age (ca. 1950 BCE) site of Mokrin in Serbia and about 100-150 years later in Shkrel, northern Albania.

Aneli et al. 2022 based on samples from EIA Dalmatia argue that the Early Iron Age Illyrians made "part of the same Mediterranean continuum" with the "autochthonous [...] Roman Republicans" and had high affinity with Daunians, part of Iapygians in Apulia, southeastern Italy. Iron Age male samples from Daunian sites have yielded J-M241>J-L283+, R-M269>Z2103+ and I-M223 lineages. Three Bronze Age males which carry J-L283 have been found in the Late Bronze Age Nuragic civilization of Sardinia. This late find in Sardinia in comparison to western Balkan samples suggests a dispersal from the western Balkans towards this region, perhaps via an intermediary group in the Italian peninsula.

In ancient Greek and Roman literature 
Different versions of the genealogy of the Illyrians, their tribes and their eponymous ancestor, Illyrius, existed in the ancient world both in fictional and non-fictional Greco-Roman literature. The fact that there were many versions of the genealogical story of Illyrius was ascertained by Ancient Greek historian Appian (1st–2nd century AD). However, only two versions of all these genealogical stories are attested. The first version—which reports the legend of Cadmus and Harmonia—was recorded by Euripides and Strabo in accounts that would be presented in detail in Bibliotheca of Pseudo-Apollodorus (1st to 2nd century AD). The second version—which reports the legend of Polyphemus and Galatea—was recorded by Appian (1st–2nd century AD) in his Illyrike.

According to the first version Illyrius was the son of Cadmus and Harmonia, whom the Enchelei had chosen to be their leaders. He eventually ruled Illyria and became the eponymous ancestor of the whole Illyrian people. In one of these versions, Illyrius was named so after Cadmus left him by a river named the Illyrian, where a serpent found and raised him.

Appian writes that many mythological stories were still circulating in his time, and he chose a particular version because it seemed to be the most correct one. Appian's genealogy of tribes is not complete as he writes that other Illyrian tribes exist, which he hasn't included. According to Appian's tradition, Polyphemus and Galatea gave birth to Celtus, Galas, and Illyrius, three brothers, progenitors respectively of Celts, Galatians and Illyrians. Illyrius had multiple sons: Encheleus, Autarieus, Dardanus, Maedus, Taulas and Perrhaebus, and daughters: Partho, Daortho, Dassaro and others. From these, sprang the Taulantii, Parthini, Dardani, Encheleae, Autariates, Dassaretii and the Daorsi. Autareius had a son Pannonius or Paeon and these had sons Scordiscus and Triballus. Appian's genealogy was evidently composed in Roman times encompassing barbarian peoples other than Illyrians like Celts and Galatians. and choosing a specific story for his audience that included most of the peoples who dwelled in the Illyricum of the Antonine era. However, the inclusion in his genealogy of the Enchelei and the Autariatae, whose political strength has been highly weakened, reflects a pre-Roman historical situation.

Basically, ancient Greeks included in their mythological accounts all the peoples with whom they had close contacts. In Roman times, ancient Romans created more mythical or genealogical relations to include various new peoples, regardless of their large ethnic and cultural differences. Appian's genealogy lists the earliest known peoples of Illyria in the group of the first generation, consisting mostly of southern Illyrian peoples firstly encountered by the Greeks, some of which were the Enchelei, the Taulantii, the Dassaretii and the Parthini. Some peoples that came to the Balkans at a later date such as the Scordisci are listed in the group that belongs to the third generation. The Scordisci were a Celtic people mixed with the indigenous Illyrian and Thracian population. The Pannonians have not been known to the Greeks, and it seems that before the 2nd century BC they did not come into contact with the Romans. Almost all the Greek writers referred to the Pannonians with the name Paeones until late Roman times. The Scordisci and Pannonians were considered Illyrian mainly because they belonged to Illyricum since the early Roman Imperial period.

History

Iron Age 

Depending on the complexity of the diverse physical geography of the Balkans, arable farming and livestock (mixed farming) rearing had constituted the economic basis of the Illyrians during the Iron Age.

In southern Illyria organized realms were formed earlier than in other areas of this region. One of the oldest known Illyrian kingdoms is that of the Enchelei, which seems to have reached its height from the 8th–7th centuries BC, but the kingdom fell from dominant power around the 6th century BC. It seems that the weakening of the kingdom of Enchelae resulted in their assimilation and inclusion into a newly established Illyrian realm at the latest in the 5th century BC, marking the arising of the Dassaretii, who appear to have replaced the Enchelei in the lakeland area of Lychnidus. According to a number of modern scholars the dynasty of Bardylis—the first attested Illyrian dynasty—was Dassaretan.

The weakening of the Enchelean realm was also caused by the strengthening of another Illyrian kingdom established in its vicinity—that of the Taulantii—which existed for some time along with that of the Enchelei. The Taulantii—another people among the more anciently known groups of Illyrian tribes—lived on the Adriatic coast of southern Illyria (modern Albania), dominating at various times much of the plain between the Drin and the Aous, comprising the area around Epidamnus/Dyrrhachium. In the 7th century BC the Taulantii invoked the aid of Corcyra and Corinth in a war against the Liburni. After the defeat and expulsion from the region of the Liburni, the Corcyreans founded in 627 BC on the Illyrian mainland a colony called Epidamnus, thought to have been the name of a barbarian king of the region. A flourishing commercial centre emerged and the city grew rapidly. The Taulantii continued to play an important role in Illyrian history between the 5th and 4th–3rd centuries BC, and in particular, in the history of Epidamnus, both as its neighbors and as part of its population. Notably they influenced the affairs in the internal conflicts between aristocrats and democrats. The Taulantian kingdom seems to have reached its climax during Glaukias' rule, in the years between 335 BC and 302 BC.

The Illyrian kingdoms frequently came into conflicts with the neighbouring Ancient Macedonians, and the Illyrian pirates were also seen as significant threat to the neighbouring peoples.

At the Neretva Delta, there was a strong Hellenistic influence on the Illyrian tribe of Daors. Their capital was Daorson located in Ošanići near Stolac in Herzegovina, which became the main center of classical Illyrian culture. Daorson, during the 4th century BC, was surrounded by megalithic, 5 meter high stonewalls, composed out of large trapeze stones blocks. Daors also made unique bronze coins and sculptures. The Illyrians even conquered Greek colonies on the Dalmatian islands.

After Philip II of Macedon defeated Bardylis (358 BC), the Grabaei under Grabos II became the strongest state in Illyria. Philip II killed 7,000 Illyrians in a great victory and annexed the territory up to Lake Ohrid. Next, Philip II reduced the Grabaei, and then went for the Ardiaei, defeated the Triballi (339 BC), and fought with Pleurias (337 BC).

During the second part of the 3rd century BC, a number of Illyrian tribes seem to have united to form a proto-state stretching from the central part of present-day Albania up to Neretva river in Herzegovina. The political entity was financed on piracy and ruled from 250 BC by the king Agron. The Illyrian attack under Agron, against Aerolians mounted in either 232 or 231 BC, is described by Polybius:

He was succeeded by his wife Teuta, who assumed the regency for her stepson Pinnes following Agron's death in 231 BC.

In his work The Histories, Polybius (2nd century BC) reported first diplomatic contacts between the Romans and Illyrians. In the Illyrian Wars of 229 BC, 219 BC and 168 BC, Rome overran the Illyrian settlements and suppressed the piracy that had made the Adriatic unsafe for Roman commerce. There were three campaigns, the first against Teuta the second against Demetrius of Pharos and the third against Gentius. The initial campaign in 229 BC marks the first time that the Roman Navy crossed the Adriatic Sea to launch an invasion.
The impetus behind the emergence of larger regional groups, such as "Iapodes", "Liburnians", "Pannonians" etc., is traced to increased contacts with the Mediterranean and La Tène 'global worlds'. This catalyzed "the development of more complex political institutions and the increase in differences between individual communities". Emerging local elites selectively adopted either La Tène or Hellenistic and, later, Roman cultural templates "in order to legitimize and strengthen domination within their communities. They were competing fiercely through either alliance or conflict and resistance to Roman expansion. Thus, they established more complex political alliances, which convinced (Greco-Roman) sources to see them as ‘ethnic’ identities."

The Roman Republic subdued the Illyrians during the 2nd century BC. An Illyrian revolt was crushed under Augustus, resulting in the division of Illyria in the provinces of Pannonia in the north and Dalmatia in the south.  Depictions of the Illyrians, usually described as "barbarians" or "savages", are universally negative in Greek and Roman sources.

Roman era and Late Antiquity 

Prior to the Roman conquest of Illyria, the Roman Republic had started expanding its power and territory across the Adriatic Sea. The Romans came nevertheless into a series of conflicts with the Illyrians, equally known as the Illyrian Wars, beginning in 229 BC until 168 BC as the Romans defeated Gentius at Scodra. The Great Illyrian Uprising took place in the Roman province of Illyricum in the 1st century AD, in which an alliance of native peoples revolted against the Romans. The main ancient source that describes this military conflict is Velleius Paterculus, which was incorporated into the second book of Roman History. Another ancient source about it is the biography of Octavius Augustus by Pliny the Elder. The two leaders of uprising were Bato the Breucian and Bato the Daesitiate.

Geographically, the name 'Illyria' came to mean Roman Illyricum which from the 4th century to the 7th century signified the prefecture of Illyricum. It covered much of the western and central Balkans. After the defeat of the Great Illyrian Revolt and the consolidation of Roman power in the Balkans, the process of integration of Illyrians in the Roman world accelerated even further. Some Illyrian communities were organized in their pre-Roman locations under their own civitates. Others migrated or were forcefully resettled in different regions. Some groups like the Azali were transferred from their homeland to frontier areas (northern Hungary) after the Great Illyrian Revolt. In Dacia, Illyrian communities like the Pirustae who were skilled miners were settled to the gold mines of Alburnus Maior where they formed their own communities. In Trajan's period these population movements were likely part of a deliberate policy of resettling, while later they involved free migrations. In their new regions, they were free salaried workers. Inscriptions show that by that era many of Illyrians had acquired Roman citizenship.

By the end of the 2nd century and beginning of the  3rd century CE, Illyrian populations had been highly integrated in the Roman Empire and formed a core population of its Balkan provinces. During the crisis of the Third Century and the establishment of the Dominate, a new elite faction of Illyrians who were part of the Roman army along the Pannonian and Danubian Limes rose in Roman politics. This faction produced many emperors from the late 3rd to the 6th century CE who are collectively known as the Illyrian Emperors and include the Constantinian, Valentinianic and Justinianic dynasties. Gaius Messius Quintus Traianus Decius , a native of Sirmium, is usually recognized as the first Illyrian emperor in historiography. The rise of the Illyrian Emperors represents the rise of the role of the army in imperial politics and the increasing shift of the center of imperial politics from the city of Rome itself to the eastern provinces of the empire.

The term Illyrians last appears in the historical record in the 7th century AD, in the  Miracula Sancti Demetrii, referring to a Byzantine garrison operating within the former Roman province of Illyricum. However, in the acts of the Second Council of Nicaea from 787, Nikephoros of Durrës signed himself as "Episcopus of Durrës, province of the Illyrians". Since the Middle Ages the term "Illyrian" has been used principally in connection with the Albanians, although it was also used to describe the western wing of the Southern Slavs up to the 19th century, being revived in particular during the Habsburg monarchy. In Byzantine literature, references to Illyria as a defined region in administrative terms end after 1204 and the term specifically began to refer only to the more confined Albanian territory.

Society

Social and political organisation 
The structure of Illyrian society during classical antiquity was characterised by a conglomeration of numerous tribes and small realms ruled by warrior elites, a situation similar like that in most other societies at that time. Thucidides in the History of the Peloponnesian War (5th century BC) addresses the social organisation of the Illyrian tribes via a speech he attributes to Brasidas, in which he recounts that the mode of rulership among the Illyrian tribes is that of dynasteia—which Thucidides used in reference to foreign customs—neither democratic, nor oligarchic. Brasidas then goes on to explain that in the dynasteia the ruler rose to power "by no other means than by superiority in fighting". Pseudo-Scymnus (2nd century BC) in reference to the social organisation of Illyrian tribes in earlier times than the era he lived in makes a distinction between three modes of social organisation. A part of the Illyrians were organized under hereditary kingdoms, a second part was organized under chieftains who were elected but held no hereditary power and some Illyrians were organised in autonomous communities governed by their own internal tribal laws. In these communities social stratification had not yet emerged.

Warfare 

The history of Illyrian warfare and weaponry spanned from around the 10th century BC up to the 1st century AD in the region defined by the Ancient Greek and Roman historians as Illyria. It concerns the armed conflicts of the Illyrian tribes and their kingdoms in the Balkan Peninsula and the Italian Peninsula as well as their pirate activity in the Adriatic Sea within the Mediterranean Sea.

The Illyrians were a notorious seafaring people with a strong reputation for piracy especially common during the regency of king Agron and later queen Teuta. They used fast and maneuverable ships of types known as lembus and liburna which were subsequently used by the Ancient Macedonians and Romans. Livy described the Illyrians along the Liburnians and Istrians as nations of savages in general noted for their piracy.

Illyria appears in Greco-Roman historiography from the 4th century BC. Illyrians were regarded as bloodthirsty, unpredictable, turbulent, and warlike by Ancient Greeks and Romans. They were seen as savages on the edge of their world. Polybius (3rd century BC) wrote: "the Romans had freed the Greeks from the enemies of all mankind". According to the Romans, the Illyrians were tall and well-built. Herodianus writes that "Pannonians are tall and strong always ready for a fight and to face danger but slow witted". Illyrian rulers wore bronze torques around their necks.

Apart from conflicts between Illyrians and neighbouring nations and tribes, numerous wars were recorded among Illyrian tribes too.

Culture

Language 
 

The languages spoken by the Illyrian tribes are an extinct and poorly attested Indo-European language group, and it is not clear whether the languages belonged to the centum or the satem group. The Illyrians were subject to varying degrees of Celticization, Hellenization, Romanization and later Slavicization which possibly lead to the extinction of their languages. In modern research, use of concepts like "Hellenization" and "Romanization" has declined as they have been criticized as simplistic notions which can't describe the actual processes via which material development moved from the centres of the ancient Mediterranean to its periphery.

The vast majority of knowledge of Illyrian is based on the Messapian language if the latter is considered an Illyrian dialect. The non-Messapian testimonies of Illyrian are too fragmentary to allow any conclusions whether Messapian should be considered part of Illyrian proper, although it has been widely thought that Messapian was related to Illyrian. An extinct Indo-European language, Messapian was once spoken in Messapia in the southeastern Italian Peninsula. It was spoken by the three Iapygian tribes of the region, the Messapians, the Daunii and the Peucetii.

On both sides on the border region between southern Illyria and northern Epirus the contact between the Illyrian and Greek languages produced an area of bilingualism between the two, although it is unclear how the impact of the one language to the other developed because of the scarcity of available archaeological material. However, this did not occur at the same level on both sides, with the Illyrians being more willing to adopt the more prestigious Greek language. Ongoing research may provide further knowledge about these contacts beyond present limited sources. Illyrians were exposed not only to Doric and Epirote Greek but also to Attic-Ionic.

The Illyrian languages were once thought to be connected to the Venetic language in the Italian Peninsula but this view was abandoned. Other scholars have linked them with the adjacent Thracian language supposing an intermediate convergence area or dialect continuum, but this view is also not generally supported. All these languages were likely extinct by the 5th century AD although traditionally, the Albanian language is identified as the descendant of Illyrian dialects that survived in remote areas of the Balkans during the Middle Ages but evidence "is too meager and contradictory for us to know whether the term Illyrian even referred to a single language".

The ancestor dialects of the Albanian language would have survived somewhere along the boundary of Latin and Ancient Greek linguistic influence, the Jireček Line. There are various modern historians and linguists who believe that the modern Albanian language might have descended from a southern Illyrian dialect whereas an alternative hypothesis holds that Albanian was descended from the Thracian language. Not enough is known of the ancient language to completely prove or disprove either hypothesis, see Origin of the Albanians.

Linguistic evidence and subgrouping 

Modern studies about Illyrian onomastics, the main field via which the Illyrians have been linguistically investigated as no written records have been found, began in the 1920s and sought to more accurately define Illyrian tribes, the commonalities, relations and differences between each other as they were conditioned by specific local cultural, ecological and economic factors, which further subdivided them into different groupings. This approach has led in contemporary research in the definition of three main onomastic provinces in which Illyrian personal names appear near exclusively in the archaeological material of each province. The southern Illyrian or south-eastern Dalmatian province was the area of the proper Illyrians (the core of which was the territory of Illyrii proprie dicti of the classical authors, located in modern Albania) and includes most of Albania, Montenegro and their hinterlands. This area extended along the Adriatic coast from the Aous valley in the south, up to and beyond the Neretva valley in the north. The second onomastic province, the central Illyrian or middle Dalmatian-Pannonian province began to its north and covered a larger area than the southern province. It extended along the Adriatic coast between the Krka and Cetina rivers, covered much of Bosnia (except for its northern regions), central Dalmatia (Lika) and its hinterland in the central Balkans included western Serbia and Sandžak. The third onomastic province further to the north defined as North Adriatic area includes Liburnia and the region of modern Ljubljana in Slovenia. It is part of a larger linguistic area different from Illyrian that also comprises Venetic and its Istrian variety. These areas are not strictly defined geographically as there was some overlap between them. The region of the Dardani (modern Kosovo, parts of northern North Macedonia, parts of eastern Serbia) saw the overlap of the southern Illyrian and Dalmatian onomastic provinces. Local Illyrian anthroponymy is also found in the area.

In its onomastics, southern Illyrian (or south-east Dalmatian) has close relations with Messapic. Most of these relations are shared with the central Dalmatian area.  In older scholarship (Crossland (1982)), some toponyms in central and northern Greece show phonetic characteristics that were thought to indicate that Illyrians or closely related peoples were settled in those regions before the introduction of the Greek language. However, such views largely relied on subjective ancient testimonies and are not supported by the earliest evidence (epigraphic etc.).

Religion 

The Illyrians, as most ancient civilizations, were polytheistic and worshipped many gods and deities developed of the powers of nature. The most numerous traces—still insufficiently studied—of religious practices of the pre-Roman era are those relating to religious symbolism. Symbols are depicted in every variety of ornament and reveal that the chief object of the prehistoric cult of the Illyrians was the Sun, worshipped in a widespread and complex religious system. The solar deity was depicted as a geometrical figure such as the spiral, the concentric circle and the swastika, or as an animal figure the likes of the birds, serpents and horses. The symbols of water-fowl and horses were more common in the north, while the serpent was more common in the south. Illyrian deities were mentioned in inscriptions on statues, monuments, and coins of the Roman period, and some interpreted by Ancient writers through comparative religion. There appears to be no single most prominent god for all the Illyrian tribes, and a number of deities evidently appear only in specific regions.

In Illyris, Dei-pátrous was a god worshiped as the Sky Father, Prende was the love-goddess and the consort of the thunder-god Perendi, En or Enji was the fire-god, Jupiter Parthinus was a chief deity of the Parthini, Redon was a tutelary deity of sailors appearing on many inscriptions in the coastal towns of Lissus, Daorson, Scodra and Dyrrhachium, while Medaurus was the protector deity of Risinium, with a monumental equestrian statue dominating the city from the acropolis. In Dalmatia and Pannonia one of the most popular ritual traditions during the Roman period was the cult of the Roman tutelary deity of the wild, woods and fields Silvanus, depicted with iconography of Pan. The Roman deity of wine, fertility and freedom Liber was worshipped with the attributes of Silvanus, and those of Terminus, the god protector of boundaries. Tadenus was a Dalmatian deity bearing the identity or epithet of Apollo in inscriptions found near the source of the Bosna river. The Delmatae also had Armatus as a war god in Delminium. The Silvanae, a feminine plural of Silvanus, were featured on many dedications across Pannonia. In the hot springs of Topusko (Pannonia Superior), sacrificial altars were dedicated to Vidasus and Thana (identified with Silvanus and Diana), whose names invariably stand side by side as companions. Aecorna or Arquornia was a lake or river tutelary goddess worshipped exclusively in the cities of Nauportus and Emona, where she was the most important deity next to Jupiter. Laburus was also a local deity worshipped in Emona, perhaps a deity protecting the boatmen sailing.

It seems that the Illyrians did not develop a uniform cosmology on which to center their religious practices. A number of Illyrian toponyms and anthroponyms derived from animal names and reflected the beliefs in animals as mythological ancestors and protectors. The serpent was one of the most important animal totems. Illyrians believed in the force of spells and the evil eye, in the magic power of protective and beneficial amulets which could avert the evil eye or the bad intentions of enemies. Human sacrifice also played a role in the lives of the Illyrians. Arrian records the chieftain Cleitus the Illyrian as sacrificing three boys, three girls and three rams just before his battle with Alexander the Great. The most common type of burial among the Iron Age Illyrians was tumulus or mound burial. The kin of the first tumuli was buried around that, and the higher the status of those in these burials the higher the mound. Archaeology has found many artifacts placed within these tumuli such as weapons, ornaments, garments and clay vessels. The rich spectrum in religious beliefs and burial rituals that emerged in Illyria, especially during the Roman period, may reflect the variation in cultural identities in this region.

Archaeology 

In total, at least six material cultures have been described to have emerged in Illyrian territories. Based on existing archaeological finds, comparative archaeological and geographical definition about them has been difficult. Archaeogenetic studies have shown that a major Y-DNA haplogroup among Illyrians, J2b-L283 spread via Cetina culture across the eastern Adriatic from the Cetina valley in Croatia to Montenegro and northern Albania. The earliest archaeogenetic find related to Cetina in Albania is the Shkrel tumulus (19th century BCE). It is the oldest J2b-L283 find in the region historically known as Illyria. Freilich et al. (2021) determined that Cetina related samples from Veliki Vanik carry similar ancestry to a Copper Age sample from the site of Beli Manastir-Popova Zemlja (late Vučedol culture), eastern Croatia. The same autosomal profile persists in the Iron Age sample from Jazinka cave. Cetina finds have been found in the western Adriatic since the second half of the thirds millenium in southern Italy. In Albania, new excavations show spread of Cetina culture in sites of central Albania (Blazi, Nezir, Keputa). Inland Cetina spread in Bosnia and Herzegovina, in particular Kotorac, a site near Sarajevo and contacts have been demonstrated with the Belotić Bela Crkva culture. During the developed Middle Bronze Age, Belotić Bela Crkva which has been recognized as another Proto-Illyrian culture developed in northeastern Bosnia and western Serbia (Čačak area). Both inhumation and cremation have been observed in sites of this culture. Similar burial customs have been observed in the Glasinac plateau of eastern Bosnia, where the Glasinac-Mati culture first developed. 

During the 7th century BC, the beginning of the Iron Age, the Illyrians emerge as an ethnic group with a distinct culture and art form. Various Illyrian tribes appeared, under the influence of the Halstatt cultures from the north, and they organized their regional centers. The cult of the dead played an important role in the lives of the Illyrians, which is seen in their carefully made burials and burial ceremonies, as well as the richness of the burial sites. In the northern parts of the Balkans, there existed a long tradition of cremation and burial in shallow graves, while in the southern parts, the dead were buried in large stone, or earth tumuli (natively called gromile) that in Herzegovina were reaching monumental sizes, more than 50 meters wide and 5 meters high. The Japodian tribe (found from Istria in Croatia to Bihać in Bosnia) have had an affinity for decoration with heavy, oversized necklaces out of yellow, blue or white glass paste, and large bronze fibulas, as well as spiral bracelets, diadems and helmets out of bronze.  Small sculptures out of jade in form of archaic Ionian plastic are also characteristically Japodian. Numerous monumental sculptures are preserved, as well as walls of citadel Nezakcij near Pula, one of numerous Istrian cities from Iron Age. Illyrian chiefs wore bronze torques around their necks much like the Celts did. The Illyrians were influenced by the Celts in many cultural and material aspects and some of them were Celticized, especially the tribes in Dalmatia and the Pannonians. In Slovenia, the Vače situla was discovered in 1882 and attributed to Illyrians. Prehistoric remains indicate no more than average height, male , female .

Early Middle Ages 

It is also evident that in a region which stretches from the southern Dalmatian coast, its hinterland, Montenegro, northern Albania up to Kosovo and Dardania, apart from a uniformity in onomastics there were also some archaeological similarities. However, it cannot be determined whether these tribes living there also formed a linguistic unity.

The Komani-Kruja culture is an archaeological culture attested from late antiquity to the Middle Ages in central and northern Albania, southern Montenegro and similar sites in the western parts of North Macedonia. It consists of settlements usually built below hillforts along the Lezhë (Praevalitana)-Dardania and Via Egnatia road networks which connected the Adriatic coastline with the central Balkan Roman provinces. Its type site is Komani and its fort on the nearby Dalmace hill in the Drin river valley. Kruja and Lezha represent significant sites of the culture. The population of Komani-Kruja represents a local, non-Slavic western Balkan people which was linked to the Roman Justinianic military system of forts. The development of Komani-Kruja is significant for the study of the transition between the classical antiquity population of Albania to the medieval Albanians who were attested in historical records in the 11th century. Within Albanian archaeology, based on the continuity of pre-Roman Illyrian forms in the production of several types of local objects found in graves, the population of Komani-Kruja is framed as a group which descended from the local Illyrians who "re-asserted their independence" from the Roman Empire after many centuries and formed the core of the later historical region of Arbanon. Illyrian-Albanian links were the main focus of Albanian nationalism during the Communism period. What was established in this early phase of research was that Komani-Kruja settlements represented a local, non-Slavic population which has been described as Romanized Illyrian, Latin-speaking or Latin-literate. This is corroborated by the absence of Slavic toponyms and survival of Latin ones in the Komani-Kruja area. In terms of historiography, the thesis of older Albanian archaeology is an untestable hypothesis as no historical sources exist which can link Komani-Kruja to the first definite attestation of medieval Albanians in the 11th century. The nationalist interpretation of the Komani-Kruja cemeteries has been roundly rejected by non-Albanian scholars. John Wilkes has described it as "a highly improbable reconstruction of Albanian history". Some Albanian scholars even today have continued to espouse this model of continuity.

Limited excavations campaigns occurred until the 1990s. Objects from a vast area covering nearby regions the entire Byzantine Empire, the northern Balkans and Hungary and sea routes from Sicily to Crimea were found in Dalmace and other sites coming from many different production centres: local, Byzantine, Sicilian, Avar-Slavic, Hungarian, Crimean and even possibly Merovingian and Carolingian. Within Albanian archaeology, based on the continuity of pre-Roman Illyrian forms in the production of several types of local objects found in graves, the population of Komani-Kruja was framed as a group which descended from the local Illyrians who "re-asserted their independence" from the Roman Empire after many centuries and formed the core of the later historical region of Arbanon. As research focused almost entirely on grave contexts and burial sites, settlements and living spaces were often ignored. Other views stressed that as an archaeological culture it shouldn't be connected to a single social or ethnic group but be contextualized in a broader Roman-Byzantine or Christian framework, nor should material finds be separated in ethnic categories as they can't be correlated to a specific culture. In this view, cemeteries from nearby regions which were classified as belonging to Slavic groups shouldn't be viewed as necessarily representing another people but as representations of class and other social factors as "ethnic identity was only one factor of varying importance". Yugoslav archaeology proposed an opposite narrative and tried to frame the population as Slavic, especially in the region of western Macedonia. Archaeological research has shown that these sites were not related to regions then inhabited by Slavs and even in regions like Macedonia, no Slavic settlements had been founded in the 7th century.

Archaeologically, while it was considered possible and even likely that Komani-Kruja sites were used continuously from the 7th century onwards, it remained an untested hypothesis as research was still limited. Whether this population represented local continuity or arrived at an earlier period from a more northern location as the Slavs entered the Balkans remained unclear at the time but regardless of their ultimate geographical origins, these groups maintained Justinianic era cultural traditions of the 6th century possibly as a statement of their collective identity and derived their material cultural references from the Justinianic military system. In this context, they may have used burial customs as a means of reference to an "idealized image of the past Roman power".

Research greatly expanded after 2009, and the first survey of Komani's topography was produced in 2014. Until then, except for the area of the cemetery, the size of the settlement and its extension remained unknown. In 2014, it was revealed that Komani occupied an area of more than 40 ha, a much larger territory than originally thought. Its oldest settlement phase dates to the Hellenistic era. Proper development began in late antiquity and continued well into the Middle Ages (13th-14th centuries). It indicates that Komani was a late Roman fort and an important trading node in the networks of Praevalitana and Dardania. Participation in trade networks of the eastern Mediterranean via sea routes seems to have been very limited even in nearby coastal territory in this era. The collapse of the Roman administration in the Balkans was followed by a broad demographic collapse with the exception of Komani-Kruja and neighbouring mountainous regions. In the Avar-Slavic raids, communities from present-day northern Albania and nearby areas clustered around hill sites for better protection as is the case of other areas like Lezha and Sarda. During the 7th century, as Byzantine authority was reestablished after the Avar-Slavic raids and the prosperity of the settlements increased, Komani saw an increase in population and a new elite began to take shape. Increase in population and wealth was marked by the establishment of new settlements and new churches in their vicinity. Komani formed a local network with Lezha and Kruja and in turn this network was integrated in the wider Byzantine Mediterranean world, maintained contacts with the northern Balkans and engaged in long-distance trade.  Winnifrith (2020) recently described this population as the survival of a "Latin-Illyrian" culture which emerged later in historical records as Albanians and Vlachs. In Winnifrith's view, the geographical conditions of northern Albania favored the continuation of the Albanian language in hilly and mountainous areas as opposed to lowland valleys. He adds that the language and religion of this culture remain uncertain. With bishops absent abroad, "the mountain flocks cannot have been too versed in theological or linguistic niceties".

Nationalism

Albanians 

The possible continuity between the Illyrian populations of the Western Balkans in antiquity and the Albanians has played a significant role in Albanian nationalism from the 19th century until the present day.

South Slavs 

At the beginning of the 19th century, many educated Europeans regarded the South Slavs as the descendants of ancient Illyrians. However, this is incorrect as Southern Slavs are descendants of Slavic tribes that migrated to the Balkans. Consequently, when Napoléon conquered part of the South Slavic lands, these areas were named after ancient Illyrian provinces (1809–1814). After the demise of the First French Empire in 1815, the Habsburg monarchy became increasingly centralized and authoritarian, and fear of Magyarization arouse patriotic resistance among Croatians. Under the influence of Romantic nationalism, a self-identified "Illyrian movement", in the form of a Croatian national revival, opened a literary and journalistic campaign initiated by a group of young Croatian intellectuals during the years of 1835–49.

In popular culture 
 The plot of 2022 movie Illyricvm is set in 37 BC and it deals with interactions between Romans and Illyrian tribes.

See also

Notes

References

Bibliography

External links 

 Phallic Cult of the Illyrians

 
Indo-European peoples
Ancient tribes in Albania
Ancient tribes in Bosnia and Herzegovina
Ancient tribes in Croatia
Ancient tribes in Kosovo
Ancient tribes in Montenegro
Ancient tribes in Serbia
Ancient tribes in the Balkans
Illyrian Albania
Illyrian Serbia
Ancient history of Slovenia
Ancient peoples of Europe